Ross Dillon (born 10 December 1947) is a former Australian rules footballer who played for Melbourne in the Victorian Football League (VFL).

A forward, Dillon topped Melbourne's goalkicking in 1969 with 48 goals and again the following season with 41. He joined Norwood in the South Australian National Football League (SANFL) in 1973 and won their best and fairest award in his third season at the club. Dillon represented both Victoria and South Australia at interstate football during his career.

External links

1947 births
Australian rules footballers from Victoria (Australia)
Melbourne Football Club players
Norwood Football Club players
Kyabram Football Club players
Living people